The hadith of black flags (Arabic: أحاديث الرايات السود) is a motif featured in Islamic apocalyptics, about people carrying black banners. These hadith were used by some to justify following the Abbasid Revolution. Many Islamist and some jihadistic groups identify themselves with black banners bearing a white .

In hadith
The hadith attributed to Muhammad say:

Interpretation

Early Islam 
Greater Khorasan is a large territory that includes most of northern Afghanistan and north-eastern Iran. From a political point of view it also includes Transoxiana and Sistan. The region that is now known as Khorasan Province encompasses less than half of historical Khorasan; the rest of that region now belongs to Afghanistan. These black banners may be those with which Abu Muslim came and overthrew the Umayyad Caliphate in 132 AH.

Jihadism 
Modern Jihadist organizations such as Al-Qaeda and ISIL also use black flags.

Justin O'Shea characterizes this hadith as "narrated by Abu Hurayrah but of questionable origin," and cites Will McCants' description of a "mythology" in which one sign of the End Times is that a Shia army with yellow flags will arise to fight the (Sunni) black flags in Syria — a mythology promoted and exploited by ISIS.

See also
 Islamic flags

References

External links
 The Black Banners

Hadith
Jihadism